Pilgrim's Way are an English folk band, formed in 2010. In 2011, they were nominated for the New Horizons award at the BBC Radio 2 Folk Awards 2012.

The band
Pilgrims' Way are a five-piece band from North West England, who rapidly became known in 2011 as one of the most prolific folk groups in the United Kingdom.  The band's influences are varied but they share a deep respect for the tradition and take as their inspiration some of the most influential bands from the 1960s/1970s revival.

Named for the Rudyard Kipling poem, set to music by Peter Bellamy, their self-stated aim is to "present gimmick-free English folk of the finest kind".

The five band members, Edwin Beasant, Jude Rees, Tom Kitching, Jon Loomes and Heather Sirrel play a wide range of instruments, often changing between them many times during sessions, which enables the band to play a diverse repertoire of music.

Awards
2011 - FATEA Magazine Tradition award winner
2012 - Spiral Earth Debut album award - nominee
2012 - BBC Radio 2 Folk Awards New Horizons award - nominee

Discography
Pilgrims' Way EP (2011)
Wayside Courtesies (2011)
Shining Gently All Around EP (2011)
Red Diesel (2016)
Stand & Deliver (2017)

References

External links 
Band Website

English folk musical groups
Musical groups established in 2010
2010 establishments in England